Lucky Comics may refer to:

 Lucky Comics (comic book), a Canadian comic-book series published by Maple Leaf Publishing in the 1940s
 , a Swiss-based French-language comics publishing house

See also
 Lucky (comic), an issue of Star Wars Tales